Who Is Clark Rockefeller? is a 2010 American police procedural television film directed by Mikael Salomon and written and co-produced by Edithe Swensen. It stars Eric McCormack as Christian Gerhartsreiter/Clark Rockefeller and Sherry Stringfield as Sandra Boss.

The film is based on the life of Christian Gerhartsreiter, a German con artist who for years impersonated many people, at one point claiming to be part of the Rockefeller family going by the faux name "Clark Rockefeller", and kidnapping his daughter.

Filming took place in Toronto in October 2009 and was released on March 13, 2010 on the Lifetime network to mixed reviews.

Premise

Christian Karl Gerhartsreiter, also known as "Clark Rockefeller," was a master imposter who successfully posed as various individuals, including a television host and a Pentagon advisor, before claiming to be a member of the famous Rockefeller family. He used his fabricated high society status to win the affections of Sandra Boss, a wealthy businesswoman, and the two eventually married and had a child. However, their relationship ended in divorce and custody battles, leading Clark to abduct their daughter. The incident ultimately exposed Clark's fraudulent past and raised questions about his true identity and the extent of his deception.

Cast
 Eric McCormack as Christian Gerhartsreiter/Clark Rockefeller, a German con artist. In order to prepare for the role, McCormack read everything about Gerhartsreiter's case, studied Natalie Morales's jailhouse interview, and also read his Vanity Fair profile. McCormack said, "The dialogue in the scene was based on public record".
 Sherry Stringfield as Sandra Boss, Gerhartsreiter's ex-wife, a millionaire with a Harvard MBA and a partner at McKinsey & Company.
 Emily Alyn Lind as Reigh 'Snooks' Boss, Gerhartsreiter and Sandra's daughter
 Stephen McHattie as Mark Sutton, an FBI detective
 Regina Taylor as Megan Norton, an FBI detective
 Ted Atherton as Det. John Ryan
 Krista Bridges as Agent Susan Pascale
 Mark Taylor as Detective Mike Ruggio
 Philip Akin as Det. Lewis Cook
 Art Hindle as William Boss
 Janet Porter as Julia Boss
 Jeffrey R. Smith as Max Bernard
 Jack Grinhaus as Lawrence Jones
 Carleigh Beverly as Meredith

Reviews
The film was met with mixed reviews. Brian Lowry of Variety said, "Who Is Clark Rockefeller? plays a bit like The Great Imposter, only with a woman caught up in the 'She's young, beautiful — and she married a con man!' scenario in the best Lifetime tradition. Sherry Stringfield stars as the hapless gal, whose character would be more sympathetic if she hadn't agreed to call her daughter 'Snooks'." He went on to praise McCormack's performance by saying, "But the real kitsch factor resides in Eric McCormack's performance as the suave charmer, which adds an element of high camp to the proceedings. Mike Hale of The New York Times said in his review that, "As a mystery and a police procedural, Who Is Clark Rockefeller? attains glossy mediocrity, but every few minutes Mr. McCormack shows up and says something like, 'You were tedious about money when I married you, and you're still tedious,' and it feels like Will & Grace all over again." He went on to praise Stringfield's performance by saying, "[she] gives a dignified, believable performance as Sandra Boss."

References

Further reading
Seal, Mark. Archived from the original on February 16, 2011. "The Man in the Rockefeller Suit". Vanity Fair. (Condé Nast Publications). January 2009. Accessed April 26, 2010.

External links
  (archive)
 
 

2010 television films
2010 films
American crime drama films
Films about the media
Films directed by Mikael Salomon
Films set in the 1970s
Films set in the 1980s
Films set in the 1990s
Films set in the 2000s
Films shot in Toronto
Lifetime (TV network) films
Crime films based on actual events
2010s English-language films
2010s American films